The Troy Hill Incline, also known as the Mount Troy Incline, was a funicular railway located in old Allegheny, Pennsylvania, which is now the North Side of the city of Pittsburgh. Built by Gustav Lindenthal or Samuel Diescher, the incline was one of only a few funiculars constructed on the north side of Pittsburgh. It began construction in August 1887, and after considerable delay, opened on 20 September 1888. The incline ascended from Ohio Street near the end of the second 30th Street Bridge to Lowrie Street on the crest of Troy Hill. Never very profitable, it shut down in fall 1898 and was razed a decade later. A building now standing at 1733 Lowrie Street was long thought to have been the summit station, but later research found that the building did not appear on maps until well after the incline closed. The incline's length measured , with a forty-seven percent (47%) gradient.  The cost of construction was about $94,047.

See also 
 List of funicular railways
 List of inclines in Pittsburgh

References

Sources
A Century of Inclines, The Society for the Preservation of the Duquesne Incline.

Defunct funicular railways in the United States
Railway inclines in Pittsburgh
Railway lines opened in 1888
Pittsburgh History & Landmarks Foundation Historic Landmarks
Troy Hill (Pittsburgh)
1888 establishments in Pennsylvania
1898 disestablishments in Pennsylvania